Ivan Konovalov (born 6 July 1959) is a Russian middle-distance runner. He competed in the men's 3000 metres steeplechase at the 1992 Summer Olympics.

References

1959 births
Living people
Athletes (track and field) at the 1992 Summer Olympics
Russian male middle-distance runners
Russian male steeplechase runners
Olympic athletes of the Unified Team
Place of birth missing (living people)
CIS Athletics Championships winners
Soviet Athletics Championships winners